Lukpa (Legba, Logba) is a Gur language spoken in Benin and Togo. It is spoken by the Yoa-Lokpa people.

References

Languages of Benin
Languages of Togo
Gurunsi languages